The AA Southside District is one of the four districts of AA Region I of the Virginia High School League. While most of the other teams in Region I are located in Hampton Roads, these high schools are found in the Southside region of Virginia southwest of Richmond. The schools in the Southside District compete with the schools in the AA Battlefield District, AA Bay Rivers District, and the A/AA Eastern Shore District.

Member schools

References

Virginia High School League